Kenmore is an American brand of household appliances owned and licensed by Transformco, an affiliate of ESL Investments.

As of 2017, Kenmore products are produced by manufacturers including Whirlpool, Samsung, LG, Electrolux, Panasonic, Cleva North America, and Winia Electronics. Today, the majority of the brand's portfolio is sold at Sears, Kmart, and Amazon. In 2019, the brand's grills and vacuum cleaners were offered at Lowe's, The Home Depot and Target.

History 

The brand first appeared on a four-drawer drop feed sewing machine sold from 1913 to 1919. The first Kenmore washing machine was introduced in 1927. The first Kenmore vacuum cleaners were introduced in 1932.

In 1976, Sears expanded the Kenmore name to its line of refrigerators, freezers, air conditioners, and dehumidifiers, which were previously branded as Coldspot.

In 2016, the Kenmore brand was expanded into consumer electronics with the launch of Kenmore-branded high definition (Kenmore HDTV) and ultra HD (Kenmore Elite UHDTV) televisions.

In July 2017, Sears announced that it will stock Kenmore products on Amazon, and also support integration between its appliances and Amazon Alexa.

In April 2018, Sears CEO and major investor Edward Lampert, along with his hedge fund ESL, offered to buy the brand along with Sears Home Services in order to diversify Sears’ already-strained assets. The hope of spinning off a stable asset, according to Lampert, is to increase capital in Sears’ portfolio, which would filter down into the stores, thus providing much needed income for the Sears brand. Lampert revised his offer to buy Kenmore in August 2018 for $400 million and without Sears' Home Services division. On October 14, 2018, Sears' parent company Sears Holdings filed for chapter 11 bankruptcy protection leaving the future of the Kenmore brand undecided. Sears will continue to sell Kenmore products and honor warranties while it undergoes restructuring. With the demise of Sears Canada, Kenmore products are no longer sold in Canada, but existing warranty for Whirlpool-made Kenmore lines continued to be honored. A number of Canadian parts suppliers continue to provide Kenmore parts previously sold by Sears Canada. Some Kenmore products are also being individually resold online in 2021.

Products 

Kenmore's upscale line of appliances is known as the Elite line. Kenmore also has a professional line of appliances called Kenmore Pro.

In October 2017, an announcement was made on the termination of the Sears-Whirlpool appliance relationship, which dates back to 1916. Sears will no longer sell Whirlpool and Whirlpool subsidiary-branded appliances, but Whirlpool will continue to supply the Kenmore appliances they make for Sears.

In October 2017, Kenmore vacuum cleaners were certified Asthma and Allergy Friendly.

As of January 2019, the Kenmore brand had over 50 products listed as top performers on the non-profit website Consumer Reports.

List of common manufacturers 

Whirlpool Corporation
LG Corporation
Electrolux
Panasonic
Winia Electronics
Samsung

References

External links 

 Kenmore
 Kenmore Live Studio on Facebook
 Sears Archives

Home appliance brands
Sears Holdings brands
American companies established in 1913
Electronics companies established in 1913
American brands
Companies that filed for Chapter 11 bankruptcy in 2018